Exaeretia fuscogriseella is a moth in the family Depressariidae. It was described by Hans-Joachim Hannemann in 1990. It is found in Russia (Altai mountains, Sayan mountains).

References

Moths described in 1990
Exaeretia
Moths of Asia